A Dell PowerEdge RAID Controller, or Dell PERC, is a series of RAID, disk array controllers made by  Dell for its PowerEdge  server computers. The controllers support SAS and SATA hard disk drives (HDDs) and solid-state drives (SSDs).

PERC versions

Series 5 family
These are compatible with 9th and 10th Generation Dell PowerEdge servers.

PERC 5/E – external
PERC 5/I – internal – integrated or adapter

Series 6  family
These are compatible with 10th and 11th Generation Dell PowerEdge servers.
PERC S100 – software based
PERC 6/E – external – adapter
PERC 6/I – internal – modular or adapter

Series 7 family
These are compatible with 10th and 11th Generation Dell PowerEdge servers.
PERC S300 – software based
PERC H200 – internal – integrated/adapter or modular
PERC H700 – internal – integrated/adapter or modular
PERC H800 – external – adapter

Series 8 family
These are compatible with 12th Generation Dell PowerEdge servers.
PERC S110 – software based
PERC H310 – adapter or mini mono or mini blade
PERC H710 – internal – adapter or mini mono or mini blade
PERC H710p – internal – adapter or mini mono or mini blade
PERC H810 – external

Series 9 family
These are compatible with 13th Generation Dell PowerEdge servers.
PERC S130 – software based
PERC H330 – internal - Adapter- Tower Servers , Mini-Mono- Rack Servers - No battery backup unit (BBU)
PERC H730 – internal - Adapter– Tower Servers and Secondary Controllers, Mini-Mono- Rack Servers
PERC H730p – internal
PERC H830 – external

Note: All PERC 9 series cards support RAID 6 except for the PERC H330.

Series 10 family
These are compatible with 14th and 15th Generation Dell PowerEdge Servers.
PERC H840
PERC H345
PERC H740p
PERC H745
PERC H745p MX

Series 11 family
PERC H755
PERC H755N - NVMe

See also
Dell DRAC
Intel Rapid Storage Technology
List of Dell PowerEdge Servers

References

External links

Dell products
Computer storage devices